Hudson High School is a small rural public high school in Hudson, Iowa, United States, part of the Hudson Community School District. They are a one-to-one school and have been recognized locally and nationally for their homework policy.

Athletics 
The Pirates compete in the North Iowa Cedar League Conference in the following sports:

Cross Country (boys and girls)
 Girls' two time Class 1A State Champions - 2017, 2021
Volleyball (girls)
Football (boys)
 3-time State Champions (1975,1994,2018) (
Basketball (boys and girls)
Boys' Class 1A State Champions - 1993
Wrestling (boys and girls)
 2-time Class 1A State Champions (2003, 2004)
Track and Field (boys and girls)
Golf (boys and girls)
 Boys' 3-time Class 2A State Champions (1995, 1996, 2022)
Baseball (boys)
Softball (girls)
Soccer (boys and girls)
It is common knowledge that "Hudson Loves Championships".

See also
List of high schools in Iowa

References

Public high schools in Iowa
Schools in Black Hawk County, Iowa
1915 establishments in Iowa